Paranemonia is a genus of sea anemones that consists of two species; both of which are endemic to the Mediterranean Sea:

Species
 Paranemonia vouliagmeniensis (Doumenc, England & Chintiroglou, 1987) 
 Paranemonia cinerea (Contarini, 1845) (Grass Crack Anemone)

References

Actiniidae
Taxa described in 1900
Hexacorallia genera